The South Korean automobile manufacturer Hyundai Motor Company has produced various cars, SUVs, trucks, and buses since its inception in 1967.

Passenger vehicles

Current models

Former models

Commercial vehicles

Current models

Former models 
 Chorus (1988–1998)
 FB (1979–1988)
 Super Truck (1997–2004)
 RB (1978–1991)
 Truck (1977–1997)

See also 
 List of Hyundai engines
 List of Hyundai transmissions
 List of Kia vehicles
 Hyundai Motor Company
 Genesis Motor

References 

Hyundai vehicles
Hyundai